Korubaşı is a village in the Taşova District, Amasya Province, Turkey. Its population is 126 (2021).

References

Villages in Taşova District